The 1978 Finnish motorcycle Grand Prix was the ninth round of the 1978 Grand Prix motorcycle racing season. It took place on 30 July 1978 at the Imatra circuit.

500cc classification

350 cc classification

250 cc classification

125 cc classification

References

Finnish motorcycle Grand Prix
Finnish
Motorcycle Grand Prix